Kara Kidman is an Australian writer and broadcaster, specialised in political satire, radio and music.

For TV, she wrote for the award-winning series The Chaser's War Against Everything broadcast on the Australian Broadcasting Corporation, the Andrew Denton-produced David Tench Tonight (Network Ten), and the top rating Sunrise programme (Channel Seven). In film, she is currently writing the feature-length fiction screenplay Radio Caroline, which was selected for the European Producers' EAVE workshops in 2008 and graduated with multiple special mentions.

Since 1995, Kidman has had articles published in the Sydney Morning Herald, Sunday Telegraph, the Chaser newspaper and jmag . In mid-2008 she commenced a regular column with news portal ninemsn.

Kidman has broadcast on national youth radio station triple j for six years, and most recently moved onto ABC presenting the Summer Overnights programme.

External links 
 ABC Radio
 Opinion Pieces by Kara
 triple j Radio
 Radio Caroline The Film
 EAVE Film Workshop
 Article written by Kara

Australian radio presenters
Australian women radio presenters
Australian screenwriters
Australian women screenwriters
Australian columnists
Australian women columnists
Australian satirists
Women satirists
Living people
Year of birth missing (living people)